Crown of Creation Meets Friends is the second album released by West German synthpop/pop group Crown of Creation. It was released in January 1998, and produced by Matthias Dorn and Philippe Beaucamp.

Track listing
All songs written by Thomas Czacharowski. "Gimme Hope" and "Better and better" are written by Thomas Czacharowski and Nicci Knauer. "Friends" was composed by Adrian Lesch and Thomas Czacharowski. Frank Müller wrote the songs for Frank & Friends.

Personnel

Crown of Creation
Nicci Knauer: Vocals
Thomas Czacharowski: Synthesizer
Adrian Lesch: Synthesizer
Olaf Oppermann: Guitar

Additional musicians
Jeanette: Backing vocals
Olaf: Backing Vocals

Production
Produced by Matthias Dorn (Ibex Studio, Großenheidorn, all tracks except 3) & Philippe Beaucamp (Studio Adam, Roissy-en-Brie, France, track 3)
Recorded & Engineered by Matthias Dorn
Technical Assistance: Thomas Czacharowski & Adrian Lesch
Mixed by Matthias Dorn

Tracks on samplers
 2003: Berenstark 10 (with When Time is lost)
 2004: Berenstark 11 (with Friends)
 2010: Abstürzende Brieftauben – TANZEN (with When Time is lost)

External links
 Official website

References 

1998 albums
Crown of Creation (band) albums